Destiny's Child was an American musical girl group whose final line-up comprised Beyoncé Knowles, Kelly Rowland, and Michelle Williams. The group began their musical career as Girl's Tyme, formed in 1990 in Houston, Texas. After years of limited success, the original quartet comprising Knowles, Rowland, LaTavia Roberson, and LeToya Luckett were signed in 1997 to Columbia Records as Destiny's Child. The group was launched into mainstream recognition following the release of the song "No, No, No" and their best-selling second album, The Writing's on the Wall (1999), which contained the number-one singles "Bills, Bills, Bills" and "Say My Name". Despite critical and commercial success, the group was plagued by internal conflict and legal turmoil, as Roberson and Luckett attempted to split from the group's manager Mathew Knowles, citing favoritism of Knowles and Rowland.

In early 2000, both Roberson and Luckett were replaced with Williams and Farrah Franklin; however, Franklin quit after a few months, leaving the group as a trio. Their third album, Survivor (2001), whose themes the public interpreted as a channel to the group's experience, produced the worldwide hits "Independent Women", "Survivor" and "Bootylicious". In 2001, they announced a hiatus to pursue solo careers. The trio reunited two years later for the release of their fifth and final studio album, Destiny Fulfilled (2004), which spawned the international hits "Lose My Breath" and "Soldier". Since the group's official disbandment in 2006, Knowles, Rowland, and Williams have reunited several times, including at the 2013 Super Bowl halftime show and 2018 Coachella festival.

Destiny's Child has sold more than 60 million records . Billboard ranks the group as one of the greatest musical trios of all time, the ninth most successful artist/band of the 2000s, placed the group 68th in its All-Time Hot 100 Artists list in 2008 and in December 2016, the magazine ranked them as the 90th most successful dance club artist of all time. The group was nominated for 14 Grammy Awards, winning twice for Best R&B Performance by a Duo or Group with Vocals and once for Best R&B Song.

History

1990–1997: Early beginnings and Girl's Tyme 
In 1990, Beyoncé Knowles met rapper LaTavia Roberson at an audition for a girl group. Based in Houston, Texas, they were joined to a group that performed rapping and dancing. Kelly Rowland, who relocated to Knowles' house because of family issues, joined them in 1992. Originally named Girl's Tyme, they were eventually cut down to six members including Támar Davis and sisters Nikki and Nina Taylor. With Knowles and Rowland, Girl's Tyme attracted nationwide attention: west-coast R&B producer Arne Frager flew to Houston to see them. He brought them to his studio, The Plant Recording Studios, in Northern California, with focus on Knowles' vocals because Frager thought she had personality and the ability to sing. With efforts to sign Girl's Tyme to a major record deal, Frager's strategy was to debut the group in Star Search, the biggest talent show on national TV at the time. However, they lost the competition because, according to Knowles, their choice of song was wrong; they were actually rapping instead of singing.

Because of the group's defeat, Knowles' father, Mathew, voluntarily dedicated his time to manage them. He decided to cut the original lineup to four, with the removal of Davis and the Taylor sisters and the inclusion of LeToya Luckett in 1993. Aside from spending time at their church in Houston, Girl's Tyme practiced in their backyards and at the Headliners Salon, owned by Knowles' mother, Tina. The group would test routines in the salon, when it was on Montrose Boulevard in Houston, and sometimes would collect tips from the customers. Their try-out would be critiqued by the people inside. During their school days, Girl's Tyme performed at local gigs. When summer came, Mathew Knowles established a "boot camp" to train them in dance and vocal lessons. After rigorous training, they began performing as opening acts for established R&B groups of that time such as SWV, Dru Hill and Immature. Tina Knowles designed the group's stage attire.

Over the course of the early years in their career, Girl's Tyme changed their name to Somethin' Fresh, Cliché, The Dolls, and to Destiny. The group signed with Elektra Records with the name Destiny, but were dropped several months later before they could release an album. The pursuit of a record deal affected the Knowles family: in 1995, Mathew Knowles resigned from his job as a medical-equipment salesman, a move that reduced Knowles' family's income by half, and her parents briefly separated due to the pressure. In 1996, they changed their name to Destiny's Child. Group members have claimed that the name was taken from a passage in the Bible:  "We got the word destiny out of the Bible, but we couldn't trademark the name, so we added child, which is like a rebirth of destiny," said Knowles. The word Destiny was stated to have been chosen from the Book of Isaiah, by Tina Knowles.

Mathew Knowles helped in negotiating a record deal with Columbia Records at the behest of Columbia scout Teresa LaBarbera Whites, which signed the group that same year. Prior to signing with Columbia, the group had recorded several tracks in Oakland, California produced by D'wayne Wiggins of Tony! Toni! Toné!. Upon the label's recognition that Destiny's Child had a "unique quality", the track "Killing Time" was included in the soundtrack to the 1997 film Men in Black.

1997–2000: Breakthrough and lineup changes 

Destiny's Child first charted in November 1997 with "No, No, No", the lead single from their self-titled debut album, which was released in the United States on February 17, 1998, featuring productions by Tim & Bob, Rob Fusari, Jermaine Dupri, Wyclef Jean, Dwayne Wiggins and Corey Rooney. Destiny's Child peaked at number sixty-seven on the Billboard 200 and number fourteen on the Billboard Top R&B/Hip-Hop Albums. It managed to sell over one million copies in the United States, earning a platinum certification by the Recording Industry Association of America (RIAA). The remix version to "No, No, No", reached number one on the Billboard Hot R&B/Hip-Hop Singles & Tracks and number three on the Billboard Hot 100. Its follow-up single, "With Me Part 1" failed to reproduce the success of "No, No, No". Meanwhile, the group featured on a song from the soundtrack album of the romantic drama Why Do Fools Fall in Love and "Get on the Bus" had a limited release in Europe and other markets. In 1998, Destiny's Child garnered three Soul Train Lady of Soul awards including Best New Artist for "No, No, No". Later that year, the group was featured in an episode of the TV sitcom Smart Guy. Knowles considered their debut successful but not huge, claiming as a neo soul record it was too mature for the group at the time.

After the success of their debut album, Destiny's Child re-entered the studio quickly, bringing in a new lineup of producers, including Kevin "She'kspere" Briggs and Rodney Jerkins. Coming up with The Writing's on the Wall, they released it on July 27, 1999, and it eventually became their breakthrough album. The Writing's on the Wall peaked at number five on the Billboard 200 and number two on R&B chart in early 2000. "Bills, Bills, Bills" was released in 1999 as the album's lead single and reached the top spot of the Billboard Hot 100, becoming their first US number-one single. The Writing's on the Wall has been credited as Destiny's Child's breakthrough album, spurring their career and introducing them to a wider audience.

On December 14, 1999, Luckett and Roberson attempted to split with their manager, claiming that he kept a disproportionate share of the group's profits and unfairly favored Knowles and Rowland. While they never intended to leave the group, when the video for "Say My Name", the third single from The Writing's on the Wall, surfaced in February 2000, Roberson and Luckett found out that two new members were joining Knowles and Rowland. Prior to the video premiere, Knowles announced on TRL that original members Luckett and Roberson had left the group. They were replaced by Michelle Williams, a former backup singer to Monica, and Farrah Franklin, an aspiring singer-actress. Shortly after her stint with Monica, Williams was introduced to Destiny's Child by a choreographer friend, and was flown to Houston where she stayed with the Knowles family.

On March 21, 2000, Roberson and Luckett filed a lawsuit against Mathew Knowles and their former bandmates for breach of partnership and fiduciary duties. Following the suit, both sides were disparaging towards each other in the media. Five months after joining, Franklin left the group. The remaining members claimed that this was due to missed promotional appearances and concerts. According to Williams, Franklin could not handle stress. Franklin, however, disclosed that she left because of the negativity surrounding the strife and her inability to assert any control in the decision-making. Her departure was seen as less controversial. Williams, on the other hand, disclosed that her inclusion in the group resulted in her "battling insecurity": "I was comparing myself to the other members, and the pressure was on me."

Towards the end of 2000, Roberson and Luckett dropped the portion of their lawsuit aimed at Rowland and Knowles in exchange for a settlement, though they continued the action against their manager. As part of the agreement, both sides were prohibited from speaking about each other publicly. Roberson and Luckett formed another girl group named Anjel but also left it due to issues with the record company. Although band members were affected by the turmoil, the publicity made Destiny's Child's success even bigger and they became a pop culture phenomenon. "Say My Name" topped the Billboard Hot 100 for three consecutive weeks, while the fourth single, "Jumpin', Jumpin'", also became a top-ten hit. The Writing's on the Wall eventually sold over eight million copies in the United States, gaining eight-time platinum certification by the RIAA. The album sold more than 11 million copies worldwide and was one of the top-selling albums of 2000. During this time, Destiny's Child began performing as an opening act at the concerts of pop singers Britney Spears and Christina Aguilera.

With Williams in the new lineup, Destiny's Child released a theme song for the soundtrack to the 2000 film Charlie's Angels. Released as a single in October 2000, "Independent Women Part 1" spent eleven consecutive weeks atop the Billboard Hot 100 from November 2000 to January 2001, the longest-running number-one single of Destiny's Child's career and of that year in the United States. The successful release of the single boosted the sales of the soundtrack album to Charlie's Angels to 1.5 million by 2001. In 2000, Destiny's Child won Soul Train's Sammy Davis Jr. Entertainer of the Year award.

2000–2003: Survivor, subsequent releases, hiatus and side projects 
At the 2001 Billboard Music Awards, Destiny's Child won several accolades, including Artist of the Year and Duo/Group of the Year, and again won Artist of the Year among five awards they snagged in 2001. In September 2000, the group took home two at the sixth annual Soul Train Lady of Soul Awards, including R&B/Soul Album of the Year, Group for The Writing's on the Wall. Destiny's Child recorded their third album, Survivor, from mid-2000 until early 2001. In the production process, Knowles assumed more control in co-producing and co-writing almost the entire album. Survivor hit record stores in the spring of 2001 and entered the Billboard 200 at number one, selling over 663,000 copies in its first week sales. The first three singles, "Independent Women Part I", "Survivor" and "Bootylicious" reached the top three in the United States and were also successful in other countries; the first two were consecutive number-one singles in the United Kingdom. The album was certified four-time platinum in the United States and double platinum in Australia. It sold 6 million copies as of July 27, 2001.

In the wake of the September 11 attacks, Destiny's Child canceled a European tour and performed in a concert benefit for the survivors. In October 2001, the group released a holiday album, 8 Days of Christmas, which contained updated versions of several Christmas songs. The album managed to reach number thirty-four on the Billboard 200. In February 2001, Destiny's Child won two Grammy awards for "Say My Name": Best R&B Vocal Performance by a Duo or Group and Best R&B Song. They also earned an American Music Award for Favorite Soul/R&B Band/Duo. Also in 2001, Destiny's Child sang backup vocals for Solange Knowles, who was the lead, on the theme song to the animated Disney Channel series The Proud Family. In March 2002, a remix compilation titled This Is the Remix was released to win fans over before a new studio album would be released. The remix album reached number 29 in the United States. The lead single "Survivor" was by some interpreted as a response to the strife between the band members, although Knowles claimed it was not directed at anybody. Seeing it as a breach of the agreement that barred each party from public disparagement, Roberson and Luckett once again filed a lawsuit against Destiny's Child and Sony Music, shortly following the release of This Is the Remix. In June 2002, remaining cases were settled in court.

In late 2000, Destiny's Child announced their plan to embark on individual side projects, including releases of solo albums, an idea by their manager. In 2002, Williams released her solo album, Heart to Yours, a contemporary gospel collection. The album reached number one on the Billboard Top Gospel Albums chart. In the same date Heart to Yours hit stores, Destiny's Child released their official autobiography, Soul Survivors. Rowland collaborated with hip hop artist Nelly on "Dilemma", which became a worldwide hit and earned Rowland a Grammy; she became the first member of Destiny's Child to have achieved a US number-one single. In the same year, Knowles co-starred with Mike Myers in the box-office hit Austin Powers in Goldmember. She recorded her first solo single, "Work It Out", for the film's soundtrack. To capitalize on the success of "Dilemma", Rowland's solo debut album Simply Deep was brought forward from its early 2003 release to September 2002. Rowland's career took off internationally when Simply Deep hit number one on the UK Albums Chart. In the same year, she made her feature film debut in the horror film Freddy vs. Jason. Meanwhile, Knowles made her second film, The Fighting Temptations, and appeared as featured vocalist on her then-boyfriend Jay-Z's single "'03 Bonnie & Clyde", which paved the way for the release of her debut solo album.

As an upshot from the success of "Dilemma", Knowles' debut album, Dangerously in Love, was postponed many times until June 2003. Knowles was considered the most successful among the three solo releases. Dangerously in Love debuted at number one on the Billboard 200, selling 317,000 copies. It yielded the number-one hits "Crazy in Love", and "Baby Boy"; and the top-five singles "Me, Myself and I" and "Naughty Girl". The album was certified 4× platinum by the Recording Industry Association of America (RIAA). It remains as Knowles' best-selling album to date, with sales of 5 million copies in the United States, as of June 2016. Worldwide, the album has sold more than eleven million copies. Knowles' solo debut was well received by critics, earning five Grammy awards in one night for Dangerously in Love, tying the likes of Norah Jones, Lauryn Hill, and Alicia Keys for most Grammys received in one night by a female artist. In November 2003, Williams appeared as Aida on Broadway. In January 2004, she released her second gospel album, Do You Know.

D'wayne Wiggins, who had produced their first recordings as Destiny's Child, filed suit in 2002 against his former counsel (Bloom, Hergott, Diemer & Cook LLP) seeking $15 million in damages for lessening his contractual agreement with the group without his consent, effectively nullifying his original contract that offered Sony Music/Columbia Destiny's Child's exclusive recording services for an initial seven years, in exchange for "certain royalties", instead of royalties only from the first three albums. The case was settled for an undisclosed amount. In June 2003, Mathew Knowles announced that Destiny's Child would expand back to a quartet, revealing Knowles' younger sister, Solange, as the latest addition to the group. Destiny's Child had previously recorded songs with Solange and shared the stage when she temporarily replaced Rowland after she broke her toes while performing. Their manager, however, said the idea was used to test reactions from the public. In August 2003, Knowles herself confirmed that her sister would not be joining in the group, and instead promoted Solange's debut album, Solo Star, released in January 2003.

2003–2006: Destiny Fulfilled and #1's 
Three years after the hiatus, members of Destiny's Child reunited to record their fourth and final studio album, Destiny Fulfilled. The album introduces the trio to a harder, "urban" sound, and songs featured are conceptually interrelated. Destiny Fulfilled saw equality in the trio: each member contributed to writing on the majority songs, as well as becoming executive producers aside from their manager. Released on November 15, 2004, Destiny Fulfilled failed to top Survivor; the album reached number two the following week, selling 497,000 copies in its first week, compared to 663,000 for the previous album. Certified three-time platinum in the United States, it was still one of the best-selling albums of 2005, selling over eight million copies worldwide; it pushed the group back into the position of the best-selling female group and American group of the year. Four singles were released from the album: the lead "Lose My Breath", "Soldier", "Cater 2 U" and "Girl"; the first two reached number three in the United States. "Soldier" "Cater 2 U" were certified platinum by the RIAA in 2006.

To promote the album, Destiny's Child embarked on their worldwide concert tour, Destiny Fulfilled... and Lovin' It Tour. On June 11, 2005, while at the Palau Sant Jordi in Barcelona, Spain, the group announced to the audience of 16,000 people that they planned to officially break up once the tour concluded. Knowles stated that the album's title Destiny Fulfilled was not a coincidence and reflected the fact that the breakup was already being planned when the album was being recorded. While making the album, they planned to part ways after their fourteen-year career as a group to facilitate their continued pursuit in individual aspirations. Knowles stated that their destinies were already fulfilled. The group sent a letter to MTV about the decision, saying:

We have been working together as Destiny's Child since we were 9 and touring together since we were 14. After a lot of discussions and some deep soul searching, we realized that our current tour has given us the opportunity to leave Destiny's Child on a high note, united in our friendship and filled with overwhelming gratitude for our music, our fans, and each other. After all these wonderful years working together, we realized that now is the time to pursue our personal goals and solo efforts in earnest...No matter what happens, we will always love each other as friends and sisters and will always support each other as artists. We want to thank all of our fans for their incredible love and support and hope to see you all again as we continue fulfilling our destinies. —Destiny's Child, MTV

Destiny's Child released their greatest hits album, #1's, on October 25, 2005. The compilation includes their number-one hits including "Independent Woman Part 1", "Say My Name" and "Bootylicious". Three new tracks were recorded for the compilation including "Stand Up for Love", which was recorded for the theme song to the World Children's Day, and "Check on It", a song Knowles recorded for The Pink Panthers soundtrack. Record producer David Foster, his daughter Amy Foster-Gillies and Knowles wrote "Stand Up for Love" as the anthem to the World Children's Day, an annual worldwide event to raise awareness and funds for children causes. Over the past three years, more than $50 million have been raised to benefit Ronald McDonald House Charities and other children's organizations. Destiny's Child lent their voices and support as global ambassadors for the 2005 program. #1's was also released as a DualDisc, featuring the same track listing, seven videos of selected songs and a trailer of the concert DVD Live in Atlanta. The DVD was filmed during the Atlanta visit of the Destiny Fulfilled ... And Lovin' It tour, and was released on March 28, 2006. It has been certified platinum by the RIAA, denoting shipments of over one million units. Notwithstanding the album title, only five of the album's 16 tracks had reached #1 on either the Billboard Hot 100 or the Hot R&B/Hip-Hop Songs chart; writer Keith Caulfield of Billboard magazine suggested that the title was "a marketing angle". Despite this, journalist Chris Harris of MTV said that the album "lives up to its name".

Disbandment and aftermath 
Destiny's Child reunited for a farewell performance at the 2006 NBA All-Star Game on February 19, 2006, in Houston, Texas; however, Knowles commented, "It's the last album, but it's not the last show." Their final televised performance was at the Fashion Rocks benefit concert in New York a few days later. On March 28, 2006, Destiny's Child was inducted into the Hollywood Walk of Fame, the 2,035th recipient of the coveted recognition. At the 2006 BET Awards, Destiny's Child won Best Group, a category they also earned in 2005 and 2001.

After their formal disbandment, all members resumed their solo careers and have each experienced different levels of success. Since then, Knowles, Rowland, and Williams have continued to collaborate on each other's solo projects through song features, music video appearances, and live performances. Both Rowland and Williams, along with Knowles' sister Solange, appeared in Knowles' music video for her single "Get Me Bodied" (2007). On June 26, 2007, the group made a mini-reunion at the 2007 BET Awards, where Knowles performed "Get Me Bodied" with Williams and Solange as her back-up dancers. After her performance, Knowles introduced Rowland who performed her single "Like This" (2007) with Eve. On the September 2, 2007 Los Angeles stop of The Beyoncé Experience tour, Knowles sang a snippet of "Survivor" with Rowland and Williams, and the latter two rendered a "Happy Birthday" song to Knowles. The performance was featured in Knowles' tour DVD, The Beyoncé Experience Live. In 2008, Knowles recorded a cover of Billy Joel's "Honesty" for Destiny's Child's compilation album Mathew Knowles & Music World Present Vol.1: Love Destiny, which was released only in Japan to celebrate the group's tenth anniversary.

Rowland made a cameo appearance in Knowles' music video for her single "Party" (2011), and the group's third compilation album, Playlist: The Very Best of Destiny's Child, was released in 2012 to mark the fifteenth anniversary since their formation. The fourth compilation album, Love Songs, was released on January 29, 2013, and included the newly recorded song "Nuclear", produced by Pharrell Williams. "Nuclear" marked the first original music from Destiny's Child in eight years. The following month, Rowland and Williams appeared as special guests for Knowles' Super Bowl XLVII halftime show, where they performed "Bootylicious", "Independent Women" and Knowles' own song "Single Ladies (Put a Ring on It)". A video album titled Destiny's Child Video Anthology was released in May 2013 and featured sixteen of the group's music videos. Knowles and Williams were then featured on Rowland's song "You Changed" from her fourth solo album Talk a Good Game (2013). Later that year, Rowland and Williams made cameo appearances in the music videos for Knowles' songs "Superpower" and "Grown Woman", which were both included on her self-titled fifth solo visual album. Williams released the single "Say Yes" in June 2014, featuring Knowles and Rowland. They performed "Say Yes" together during the 2015 Stellar Awards, and the live version of the song was mastered for iTunes in April 2015. On November 7, 2016, the group reunited in a video to try the Mannequin Challenge, which was posted on Rowland's official Instagram account. The group reunited for Beyoncé's headline performance at Coachella in April 2018 which was released as the Homecoming documentary and homonymous live album.

Artistry

Musical style and themes 
Destiny's Child recorded R&B songs with styles that encompass urban, contemporary, and dance-pop. In the group's original lineup, Knowles was the lead vocalist, Rowland was the second lead vocalist, Luckett was on soprano, and Roberson was on alto. Knowles remained as the lead vocalist in the group's final lineup as a trio, however, Rowland and Williams also took turns in singing lead for the majority of their songs. Destiny's Child cited R&B singer Janet Jackson as one of their influences. Ann Powers of The New York Times described Destiny's Child music as "fresh and emotional ... these ladies have the best mixes, the savviest samples and especially the most happening beats." In the same publication, Jon Pareles noted that the sound that defines Destiny's Child, aside from Knowles' voice, "is the way its melodies jump in and out of double-time. Above brittle, syncopated rhythm tracks, quickly articulated verses alternate with smoother choruses." The group usually harmonize their vocals in their songs, especially on the ballads. In most instances of their songs, each member sings one verse and chimes in at the chorus. In their third album Survivor (2001), each member sings lead in the majority of the songs. Knowles said, "... everybody is a part of the music ... Everybody is singing lead on every song, and it's so great—because now Destiny's Child is at the point vocally and mentally that it should be at." Knowles, however, completely led songs like "Brown Eyes" and "Dangerously in Love 2". The group explored themes of sisterhood and female empowerment in songs such as "Independent Women" and "Survivor", but have also been criticized for the anti-feminist message of songs such as "Cater 2 U" and "Nasty Girl".

Survivor contains themes interpreted by the public as a reference to the group's internal conflict. The title track, "Survivor", which set the theme used throughout the album, features the lyrics "I'm not gonna blast you on the radio ... I'm not gonna lie on you or your family ... I'm not gonna hate you in the magazine" caused Roberson and Luckett to file a lawsuit against the group; the lyrics were perceived to be a violation over their agreement following a settlement in court. In an interview, Knowles commented: "The lyrics to the single 'Survivor' are Destiny's Child's story because we've been through a lot, ... We went through our drama with the members ... Any complications we've had in our 10-year period of time have made us closer and tighter and better." In another song called "Fancy", which contains the lyrics "You always tried to compete with me, girl ... find your own identity", was interpreted by critic David Browne, in his review of the album for Entertainment Weekly magazine, as a response to the lawsuit. Stephen Thomas Erlewine of AllMusic summarized Survivor as "a determined, bullheaded record, intent on proving Destiny's Child has artistic merit largely because the group survived internal strife. ... It's a record that tries to be a bold statement of purpose, but winds up feeling forced and artificial." Despite the album's receiving critical praise, Knowles' close involvement has occasionally generated criticism. Knowles wrote and co-produced the bulk of Survivor. Browne suggested that her help made Survivor a "premature, but inevitable, growing pains album". In the majority of the songs on their final studio album Destiny Fulfilled (2004), the verses are divided into three sections, with Knowles singing first, followed by Rowland, then Williams; the three harmonize together during the choruses.

Public image 

Destiny's Child were compared to The Supremes, a 1960s American female singing group, with Knowles being compared to Supremes frontwoman Diana Ross; Knowles, however, has dismissed the notion. Coincidentally, Knowles starred in the film adaptation of the 1981 Broadway musical Dreamgirls as Deena Jones, the frontwoman of the Dreams, a female singing group based on the Supremes. With Knowles' wide role assumed in the production of Survivor, Gil Kaufman of MTV noted that "it became clear that Beyoncé was emerging as DC's unequivocal musical leader and public face". Her dominance to the creative input in the album made the album "very much her work". For Lola Ogunnaike of The New York Times, "It's been a long-held belief in the music industry that Destiny's Child was little more than a launching pad for Beyoncé Knowles' inevitable solo career."

In the wake of Knowles' debut solo album Dangerously in Love (2003), rumors spread about a possible split of Destiny's Child after each member had experienced solo success and had ongoing projects. Comparisons were drawn to Justin Timberlake, who did not return to band NSYNC after his breakthrough debut solo album, Justified. Rowland responded to such rumors, announcing they were back in the studio together. The group claimed that the reunion was destined to happen and that their affinity to each other kept them cohesive. Margeaux Watson, arts editor at Suede magazine, suggested that Knowles "does not want to appear disloyal to her former partners," and called her decision to return to the group "a charitable one". Knowles' mother, Tina, wrote a 2002-published book, titled Destiny's Style: Bootylicious Fashion, Beauty and Lifestyle Secrets From Destiny's Child, an account of how fashion influenced Destiny's Child's success.

Legacy 

Destiny's Child have been referred to as R&B icons, and have sold more than 60 million records worldwide. Following the disbandment of Destiny's Child, MTV's James Montgomery noted that "they have left a fairly sizable legacy behind" as "one of the best-selling female pop vocal groups in history." Billboard observed that Destiny's Child were "defined by a combination of feisty female empowerment anthems, killer dance moves and an enviable fashion sense," while Essence noted that they "set trends with their harmonious music and cutting-edge style." In 2015, Daisy Jones of Dazed Digital published an article on how the group made a significant impact in R&B music, writing "Without a hint of rose tint, Destiny's Child legitimately transformed the sound of R&B forever... their distinct influence can be found peppered all over today's pop landscape, from Tinashe to Ariana Grande." Nicole Marrow of The Cut magazine believed that R&B music in the 1990s and early 2000s "was virtually redefined by the success of powerhouse performers like TLC and Destiny's Child, who preached a powerful litany of embracing womanhood and celebrating individuality." Hugh McIntyre of Forbes wrote that before The Pussycat Dolls and Danity Kane burst onto the music scene in the mid-2000s, Destiny's Child were "the reigning queens" of the girl group genre.

Writing for Pitchfork, Katherine St. Asaph noticed how Destiny's Child defined the revival of girl groups similar to The Supremes in the early-to-mid-'90s, saying:
There is no better microcosm of what happened to Top 40 music between 1993 and 1999 than this. Bands like the “Star Search” winner were buried in a landfill of post-grunge, while R&B groups built out from soul and quiet storm to create a sound innovative enough to earn the “futuristic” label almost everything got in that pre-Y2K time. This bore itself out in the revival in the early-to-mid-’90s of excellent girl groups vaguely in the Supremes mold—TLC, En Vogue, SWV—but it would be Destiny’s Child who would become their true successors.

Destiny's Child's final lineup as a trio has been widely noted as the group's most recognizable and successful lineup. Billboard recognized them as one of the greatest musical trios of all time; they were also ranked as the third most successful girl group of all time on the Billboard charts, behind TLC and The Supremes. The group's single "Independent Women" (2000) ranked second on Billboards list of the "Top 40 Biggest Girl Group Songs of All Time on the Billboard Hot 100 Chart". "Independent Women" was also acknowledged by the Guinness World Records as the longest-running number-one song on the Hot 100 by a girl group. The term "Bootylicious" (a combination of the words booty and delicious) became popularized by Destiny's Child's single of the same and was later added to the Oxford English Dictionary in 2006. The term was also used to describe Beyoncé during the 2000s decade due to her curvaceous figure. VH1 included "Bootylicious" on their "100 Greatest Songs of the '00s" list in 2011, and Destiny's Child on their "100 Greatest Women in Music" list the following year. Additionally, "Independent Women" was ranked as one of NMEs "100 Best Songs of the 00s". Destiny's Child was honored at the 2005 World Music Awards with the World's Best Selling Female Group of All Time Award, which included a 17-minute tribute performance by Patti LaBelle, Usher, Babyface, Rihanna, Amerie and Teairra Mari. In 2006, the group was awarded a star on the Hollywood Walk of Fame.

Destiny's Child has been credited as a musical influence or inspiration by several artists including Rihanna, Meghan Trainor, Fifth Harmony, Little Mix, Girls Aloud, Haim, Jess Glynne, Katy B, and RichGirl. Ciara was inspired to pursue a career in music after seeing Destiny's Child perform on television. Ariana Grande cited Destiny's Child as one of her vocal inspirations, saying that listening to the group's music is how she discovered her range and "learned about harmonies and runs and ad-libs." Meghan Trainor stated that her single "No" (2016) was inspired by the late 1990s and early 2000s sounds of Destiny's Child, NSYNC, and Britney Spears. Fifth Harmony cited Destiny's Child as their biggest inspiration, and even paid tribute to the group by performing a medley of "Say My Name", "Independent Women", "Bootylicious" and "Survivor" on the television show Greatest Hits. Fifth Harmony also incorporated elements of the intro from "Bootylicious" for the intro to their own song "Brave, Honest, Beautiful" (2015).

Discography 

 Destiny's Child (1998)
 The Writing's on the Wall (1999)
 Survivor (2001)
 8 Days of Christmas (2001)
 Destiny Fulfilled (2004)

Members

Tours 

Headlining
1999 European Tour (1999)
2002 World Tour (2002)
Destiny Fulfilled World Tour (2005)

Co-headlining
Total Request Live Tour (with 3LW, Dream, Jessica Simpson, City High, Eve and Nelly with the St. Lunatics) (2001)

Opening act
SWV World Tour (opened for SWV) (1996)
Evolution Tour (opened for Boyz II Men) (1998)
FanMail Tour (opened for TLC) (1999)
Introducing IMx Tour (opened for IMx) (2000)
Christina Aguilera in Concert (opened for Christina Aguilera) (2000){
(You Drive Me) Crazy Tour (opened for Britney Spears) (2000)

Awards and nominations 

Destiny's Child has won three Grammy Awards from fourteen nominations. The group has also won five American Music Awards, two BET Awards, a BRIT Award, a Guinness World Record, and two MTV Video Music Awards.

See also 
 List of best-selling girl groups

References

External links 

 
 
 
 

 
African-American girl groups
American girl groups
American pop girl groups
American contemporary R&B musical groups
Brit Award winners
Feminist musicians
Gold Star Records artists
Grammy Award winners
Musical groups disestablished in 2006
Musical groups established in 1997
Musical groups from Houston
American musical trios
Teen pop groups
Vocal trios
World Music Awards winners
Vocal quartets
Vitamin Records artists